Stefan Persson may refer to:

Stefan Persson (magnate) (born 1947), owner of Swedish fashion company Hennes & Mauritz
Stefan Persson (ice hockey) (born 1954), retired ice hockey player
Stefan Persson (swimmer) (born 1967), Swedish swimmer
Stefan Persson (bandy) (born 1974), Swedish bandy player